Duncan Mackinnon (29 September 1887 – 9 October 1917) was a British rower who competed in the 1908 Summer Olympics. He was killed in action during the First World War.

Mackinnon was born in Paddington, London, and was educated at Rugby School and Magdalen College, Oxford. He rowed for his college and the Magdalen College Coxless four won the Stewards' Challenge Cup and the Visitors' Challenge Cup at Henley Royal Regatta in 1907 and 1908. The Magdalen crew was chosen to represent Great Britain rowing at the 1908 Summer Olympics, and Mackinnon was in the four with Collier Cudmore, John Somers-Smith and James Angus Gillan. The crew won the gold medal for Great Britain and defeated a Leander crew. Subsequently, Mackinnon rowed for the winning Oxford crews in the Boat Race in 1909, 1910 and 1911. Mackinnon was also in the winning crew in the Grand Challenge Cup twice and in the Wyfold Challenge Cup once, losing only two races in all his Henley appearances.

After Oxford, Mackinnon became a partner in the family business in Calcutta. He returned to England on the outbreak of World War I and was commissioned into the Royal North Devon Hussars. He transferred to the Scots Guards and serving with them as a lieutenant he was killed in action at Ypres in the Battle of Passchendaele, aged 30. His remains were not recovered and his name is recorded on the Tyne Cot Memorial nearby.

Mackinnon left a legacy of £80,000 to establish scholarships at Magdalen College which became effective by reversion in 1938.

See also
 List of Olympians killed in World War I
 List of Oxford University Boat Race crews

References

External links
The Rowers of Vanity Fair – Introduction

1887 births
1917 deaths
People educated at Rugby School
Alumni of Magdalen College, Oxford
English male rowers
British male rowers
Olympic rowers of Great Britain
Rowers at the 1908 Summer Olympics
English Olympic medallists
Olympic gold medallists for Great Britain
Scots Guards officers
British military personnel killed in World War I
Olympic medalists in rowing
Medalists at the 1908 Summer Olympics
British Army personnel of World War I